Johann Andreas Naumann (13 April 1744 – 15 May 1826) was a German farmer and an amateur naturalist. He was the father of Johann Friedrich Naumann and geologist Georg Amadeus Carl Friedrich Naumann. He wrote an important book on the birds of Germany entitled Naturgeschichte der Vögel Deutschlands (1804), and his name has been commemorated in the Latin names of the birds lesser kestrel, Falco naumanni, and the Naumann's thrush, Turdus naumanni.

External links
Naturgeschichte der Vögel Deutschlands, nach einigen Erfahrungen entworfen &c. (Naumann, et al., 1822) Vol 2.T.

1744 births
1826 deaths
People from Südliches Anhalt
German naturalists